West Moonah is a residential suburb of Hobart, Tasmania, Australia. It is part of the City of Glenorchy local government area, with about 5% being in the Hobart LGA. At the 2016 Australian census, the suburb recorded a population of approximately 1,000.

Formerly known as Springfield, the area is fast becoming acceptable because of its closeness to the city. The West Moonah Community Centre is a hub for community activities in the community. Located next to a park, the Community Centre offers a community preschool, playgroups, community garden, community computer lab, craft classes, walking and other community activities.

West Moonah has two schools. Springfield Gardens Primary School is a public school and the independent Seventh-day Adventist Hilliard Christian School. There are also two parks, including the Jim Bacon Reserve with its community pathway.

West Moonah is nearby shopping areas, schools, churches, government services, sporting facilities and childcare centres in the neighbouring suburbs of Glenorchy, Derwent Park and Moonah. West Moonah is serviced by one bus route. By car, West Moonah is 15 minutes from downtown Hobart and 6 minutes from New Town.

References

Localities of City of Hobart